Patrick Bedard (born August 20, 1941, in La Porte City, Iowa) is an American automobile racing driver and journalist.

In the early 1970s, Car and Driver magazine challenged its readers to a series of Sports Car Club of America (SCCA)-sanctioned, 25-lap "showroom stock sedan" races. In the Car and Driver SS/Sedan Challenge II, Bedard finished first, driving Car & Driver's own Opel 1900 sedan. In the Car and Driver SS/Sedan Challenge III in 1974, Bedard drove a 1973 Chevy Vega GT No. 0, winning the tie-breaker race. This lone Vega beat 31 other well-driven showroom stocks.

The first racing victory by a Wankel-engined car in the United States was in 1973, when Bedard won an IMSA RS race at Lime Rock Park in a Mazda RX-2. In the 1984 Indianapolis 500 Bedard's car slammed the inside wall and then flipped multiple times in the grass. He remarkably survived the crash.

Bedard drove for Jaguar Cars in endurance racing, and later drove in the Indianapolis 500 in 1983 and 1984. He finished 30th both times, the second time retiring through a colossal accident where his car flipped several times. Bedard then retired from motor racing but continued to write for Car and Driver magazine, where he had been employed since March, 1968.

After nearly 42 consecutive years of employment with Car and Driver, Bedard announced he was leaving the magazine in his regular column after the August 2009 issue.

Racing record

USAC Mini-Indy Series results

Indianapolis 500 results

(key) (Races in bold indicate pole position)

24 Hours of Le Mans results

References

Motoring journalists
American racing drivers
Indianapolis 500 drivers
24 Hours of Le Mans drivers
1941 births
Living people
People from La Porte City, Iowa
Racing drivers from Iowa
20th-century American journalists
American male journalists